The Ndali are a Bantu ethnolinguistic group native to Momba District in Songwe Region, Tanzania and northern Malawi.  In 1987 the Ndali population of Tanzania was estimated to number 150,000, and in 2003 the population in Malawi was estimated at 70,000, for a total for the group of about 220,000. Their language is related to many Bantu languages, for example Nyakyusa .

Majority of Ndali people are found in southern highlands of Tanzania and northern Malawi. In Tanzania they are mainly found in Ileje district and some in mbozi.chunya and other parts of Tanzania. 99.999 of them are Christian mostly Moravian and Lutheran worshipers.

Common clans are Shimwela, Nyangwe, Chibhona, Kamwela, Kayuni, Cheyo, Kalinga, Mogha, Swila, Lwesya, etc.  most of the clans represents certain events or traditional meaning. The names starts with Sh, Chi and Ka.

Main food is chiponde, mashed sweet potatoes mixed with beans.  Hingundya, ngati. Rice and chicken.
They are very humble and hard working religious people.

Ethnic groups in Malawi
Ethnic groups in Tanzania
Indigenous peoples of East Africa